Hotel RL by Red Lion is an upscale hotel brand owned by Red Lion Hotels Corporation that was created in 2014.

History
Hotel RL was announced on October 21, 2014 by Red Lion Hotels Corporation as an upscale conversion hotel brand. The brand targets top 80 United States urban markets and is designed to resonate with the customers who have a millennial generation mindset.

The first two Hotel RL's opened in Baltimore, Maryland and Washington DC in August and November 2015, respectively.  Several more Hotel RL openings are planned in the future, including at least 4 in 2016 in the cities of St. Louis, Salt Lake City, Spokane, and Olympia., and 1 in 2017 in College Station, Texas.

References

External links

Hotel chains in the United States
Red Lion Hotels Corporation